Side Streets, also known in the UK as A Woman in Her Thirties, is a 1934 American romantic melodrama film starring Aline MacMahon and Paul Kelly. The screenplay concerns a spinster who hires, then marries, a destitute sailor who is not always faithful.

Plot summary

Cast
 Aline MacMahon as Bertha Krasnoff
 Paul Kelly as Tim O'Hara
 Ann Dvorak as Marguerite Gilbert
 Dorothy Tree as Ilka
 Helen Lowell as Tillie
 Henry O'Neill as George Richards
 Mayo Methot as Maizie Roach
 Renee Whitney as Mabel Vernon
 Lynn Browning as Madeline Ware
 Lorena Layson as Helen Ware
 Dorothy Peterson as Mrs. Richards
 Clay Clement as Jack
 Paul Kaye as Ray

Reception
The New York Times film critic Mordaunt Hall panned Side Streets, calling it "one of those wearying examples of writing down to what the studio believes to be the intelligence level of certain cinema audiences." However, he note that "Miss MacMahon and Mr. Kelly do all that is possible with their thankless roles. Ann Dvorak and Helen Lowell also make the most of their scant opportunities."

Box office
According to Warner Bros records the film earned $126,000 domestically and $65,000 internationally.

References

External links
 
 
 
 

1934 films
1934 romantic drama films
American romantic drama films
American black-and-white films
Films directed by Alfred E. Green
Films set in San Francisco
First National Pictures films
1930s English-language films
1930s American films